Htet Htet Moe Oo (born Hmone Shwe Yi on 8 May 1971) is a two-time Myanmar Academy Award winning Burmese actress, most well known as the "queen of commercials" for her prolific TV commercial appearances during the 1990s to early 2000s.

Early life and education 
Htet Htet Moe Oo was born on 8 May 1971 in Mogok, Mandalay Division, Burma, to a painter, Khin Aung, also known by his artist name, Myat Aung, and his wife, Khin Myo Nyunt.

Career 
She entered the entertainment industry around 1991 to 1992, and eventually changed her name to Htet Htet Moe Oo, under the tutelage of director San Aung. Her first film, Real Person also starred Soe Thu and Soe Myat Thuzar . She later starred in Tharaphu, also starring Moh Moh Myint Aung and Ye Aung. She won the Myanmar Motion Picture Academy Awards for Best Actress in 1996 and 2001.

Personal life 
Htet Htet Moe Oo has been legally married three times; she was previously married to Burmese actor, Min Oo, and was married to Burmese musician Anegga from 2004 to 2008. She married Zu Myat Htet, also known as Sai Lwan, an actor, on 10 August 2010. The two have a daughter, Sit Lun Wadi Htet (b. 2011). In 2012, she was fined Ks.1,000/- (US$1) by a Yangon court for slapping a 7Day News journalist who asked about her matrimonial affairs during a press event.

Filmography (big screen movies)

Awards and nominations

References

External links

1971 births
Burmese film actresses
Living people
20th-century Burmese actresses
21st-century Burmese actresses
People from Mandalay Region